Manifest Tyranny is the fifth full-length album by progressive metal band Andromeda.

The album was reviewed with 8/10 by Powermetal.de, 9/10 by Metal.de, but only 6.5/10 by Rockhard.de.

Track listing
 "Preemptive Strike" - 2:32
 "Lies 'R' Us" - 5:19
 "Stay Unaware" - 6:21
 "Survival of the Richest" - 6:02
 "False Flag" - 9:38
 "Chosen By God" - 4:35
 "Asylum" - 7:03
 "Play Dead" - 7:47
 "Go Back to Sleep" - 7:40
 "Antidote" - 7:02

Personnel
 David Fremberg - vocals
 Johan Reinholdz - guitars
 Thomas Lejon - drums
 Martin Hedin - keyboards
 Fabian Gustavsson - bass

References

Metalinside.de review

2011 albums
Andromeda (Swedish band) albums